The Beach of Dreams is a 1919 novel by the Anglo-Irish writer Henry De Vere Stacpoole. A French society woman finds herself shipwrecked on an island after going on a yachting cruise.

Film adaptation
In 1921 it was adapted into an American silent film Beach of Dreams directed by William Parke and starring Edith Storey, Noah Beery and Jack Curtis.

References

Bibliography
 Goble, Alan. The Complete Index to Literary Sources in Film. Walter de Gruyter, 1999.

1919 British novels
Novels by Henry De Vere Stacpoole
Novels set in France
British novels adapted into films
John Lane (publisher) books